Powhatan County Public Schools is the public school system of Powhatan County, Virginia, United States. As of 2019, there are about 4,300 students enrolled in 5 accredited schools. The district is led by superintendent Dr. Beth Teigen.

Schools

High Schools (9-12) 

 Powhatan High School
The facility was completed in 2003.

Middle Schools (6-8) 

 Powhatan Middle School
Formerly Powhatan Junior High School, the half the building was torn down and redone in 2018 to be Powhatan Middle School. The facility is 48,000 Sq. Ft, and 2 stories.

Elementary Schools (PreK-5) 

 Powhatan Elementary School
The facility was completed in 1987.
 Pocahontas Elementary School
The facility was completed in 1996. 
 Flat Rock Elementary School
The facility was completed in 2008.

Other facilities 
Pocahontas Landmark Center, previously known as Pocahontas Middle School was renovated in 2019 to house the district's administration staff, and school board meeting room.

Powhatan Transportation Facility, is a 16,000 Sq. Ft. facility that houses the school district's dispatching department, and 3 maintenances garages for district busses and vehicles. The facility also has built in fuel pumps and a 2.5 acre parking lot for dispatch staff and busses.

Controversies 
In 2019, a Flat Rock Elementary School employee was accused by parents of assaulting children when grabbing them because of food being thrown in the cafeteria. According to the Assistant Commonwealth's Attorney, witness statements were inconsistent and there was not enough concrete evidence to make a case. No charges were filed against the employee, and they have returned to work.

On June 30, 2022, Andrew Clinton Snead, the Districts Performing Arts Coordinator was arrested on 2 counts of taking indecent liberties with a minor. Snead was placed on unpaid administrative leave. In September, 6 more charges were placed on Snead, with a total of 8 charges spanning back over 10 years. Including 8 felonies, seven counts of taking indecent liberties with a child by a person in a custodial or supervisory relationship, and one of solicitation of child pornography.

References

Education in Powhatan County, Virginia
School divisions in Virginia